Michaela Kölmel (1956 - 2007) was a German artist and university professor.

Life and work
Michaela Kölmel's artistic work includes drawings, sculptures, site-specific installations, and interventions in public spaces.[1]

From 1980 to 1986, she studied at the State Academy of Fine Arts in Karlsruhe under Prof. Hiromi Akiyama and Prof. David Lauer. She got awarded the Graduate Scholarship of the State of Baden-Württemberg.[2] Further scholarships took her to the Cité des Arts in Paris (1992). She also received a lectureship at the University of Pforzheim (1995/99) and Ahrenshoop (2000), funded by the Kunstfonds Berlin.[3] In 2002, Michaela Kölmel became a professor at Mainz University of Applied Sciences, where she taught the course Interior Design, Sculpture, Drawing, and Art History until she died in 2007.[2]

Concept, process, and material determine her work.[4] Working in the tradition of minimalism prominent in the 1960s, she explored the complexity found in the simple and elemental.[4] Her work examined the contrast between forms with a straightforward and unspectacular exterior and those with a mysterious, luminous interior, using such materials as highly polished copper tubes, stainless steel sheets, and mirror glass.[5]

The artist transformed these materials into a wall- and floor-related works. She also used them in site-specific productions to connect spaces and generate unusual fields of perception (Installation MultiMediale 2 and ZKM 1992,[4] Installation Orgelhalle 1994,[6] Installation Galerie Rottloff, 2006[7]). Using materials that reflect light, Michaela Kölmel created complex sensorial spaces of high intensity with simple means; she contained dense formal language that opened up difficult dialogues between the work, the viewer, and the room.[8]

In her drawings, Kölmel preferred foil, graphite powder, and a cutting knife to conventional paper and pencil.[9] She created arrangements of memorable lines through cuts on the dark gray, slightly shiny graphite surface.[10] With their relief-like appearance and the special treatment of the materials, her graphic works subtly weave interfaces between dark and light.[11]

Michaela Kölmel's work is part of many notable public collections, amongst which the Ministry of Science and Art of Baden-Württemberg, the Staatliche Kunsthalle Karlsruhe,[12] the ZKM Center for Art and Media Karlsruhe,[13] and the Städtische Galerie Karlsruhe [de].[14] They are also in numerous private collections, such as the Museum für aktuelle Kunst – Sammlung Hurrle [de] and the collection of Reinhold Würth.[15]

Gallery

Selected exhibitions

2019 "LichtSchatten", Solo Show, Karlsruhe Lukaskirche
2012 "gestern-heute-morgen", Group Show, Kunstgebäude Stuttgart (GA)
2011 "Spektral – Diametral", Group Show, Städtische Galerie Karlsruhe
2009 Group Show, Kunstverein Augsburg,
2004 "Painting and sculpture since 1960", Group Show, Staatliche Kunsthalle Karlsruhe
2000 "Gabriele Münter Prize", Group Show, Frauenmuseum Bonn (GA)
1999 "Kunstmesse Düsseldorf", Solo Show, Galerie Rottloff
1999 "Objekte", Solo Show, Galerie Rottloff
1997 "Förderverein aktuelle Kunst", Solo Show, FAK Münster
1996 "Michaela Kölmel", Solo Show, Badischer Kunstverein Karlsruhe
1996 "von der Farbe zum Licht", Group Show, Staatliche Kunsthalle Karlsruhe
1995 Group Show, Galerie Karin Friebe Mannheim
1993 "Sculptura Ulm '93", Group Show, Pro Arte Ulmer Kunststiftung
1992 "MultiMediale 2", Group Show with Karlheinz Bux Karlheinz Bux, ZKM Karlsruhe

References

External link

1956 births
2007 deaths
21st-century German women artists
20th-century German women artists
Artists from Karlsruhe
Academic staff of the Pforzheim University of Applied Sciences